Vallings is a surname. Notable people with the surname include:

 Gabrielle Vallings (1886–1969), British singer and novelist
 George Vallings  (1932–2007), British Royal Navy officer 
 Ros Vallings, New Zealand medical doctor